Socket FM1 is a CPU socket for desktop computers used by AMD early A-series APUs ("Llano") processors and Llano-derived Athlon II processors. It was released in July 2011. Its direct successors are Socket FM2 (September 2012) and Socket FM2+ (January 2014), while Socket AM1 (January 2014) is targeting low-power SoCs.

Chipsets 
For available chipsets consult Fusion controller hubs (FCH).

Available APUs 
APU's using Socket FM1 are AMD's Lynx platform.

Please consult List of AMD accelerated processing units for concrete product denominations.

Feature overview for AMD APUs

See also 
 Family 12h microarchitecture
 Comparison of AMD chipsets#Fusion controller hubs (FCH)
  List of FM1 Processors

References 

 http://www.tomshardware.com/news/amd-llano-socket-fm1-sample,12549.html
 https://www.amd.com/us/products/desktop/processors/a-series/Pages/a-series-model-number-comparison.aspx

AMD sockets